Legend of Sudsakorn is a 2006 Thai fantasy film. It is based on a story from Phra Aphai Mani, an epic poem by Sunthorn Phu. Charlie Trairat, the young male lead from Fan Chan, portrays the title character, a boy who is the son of a mermaid who is sent on a magical quest to find his father, a prince. It is a mix of live action and computer-generated imagery.

The story was previously adapted in the 1979 Thai animated feature, The Adventure of Sudsakorn.

Cast
 Charlie Trairat as Sudsakorn
 Suchao Pongwilai as Prachao Ta
 Pemanee Sungkorn as Sudsakorn's mother 
 Surachai Sangarkart as Prince Aphai Mani

External links
Official site

2006 films
Fantasy adventure films
Films based on poems
Thai fantasy films
Thai-language films